RBG may refer to:

People

 Ruth Bader Ginsburg (1933–2020), Associate Justice of the Supreme Court of the United States
RBG (film), a 2018 American documentary film about Supreme Court Justice Ruth Bader Ginsburg

Transport

 ICAO designator for Air Arabia Egypt, an Egyptian airline
 IATA identifier code for Roseburg Regional Airport, Oregon, United States
 Regental Bahnbetriebs-GmbH, German railway company

Technology

 Random blood glucose, a test for blood sugar
 Random bit generator or random number generator, a term used in computer science
 Rubber band gun, a toy gun used to fire one or more rubber bands

Other

 RBG Resources, a British public-limited firm based in London
 RBG: Revolutionary but Gangsta, a 2004 hip-hop album by duo Dead Prez
 Red Barn Gallery, a photography gallery in Belfast, Northern Ireland
 Red, Black and Green, the traditional African colors created by the UNIA
 Rhema Media, a New Zealand Christian media organization previously known as Rhema Broadcasting Group
 Royal Borough of Greenwich, a local authority district in southeast London, United Kingdom
 Royal Botanical Gardens (disambiguation), several Royal Botanic Gardens or Royal Botanical Gardens

See also
RGB (disambiguation)